Michael Roy Kitchen (born 31 October 1948) is an English actor and television producer, best known for his starring role as Detective Chief Superintendent Christopher Foyle in the ITV drama Foyle's War, which comprised eight series between 2002 and 2015. He also played the role of Bill Tanner in two James Bond films, and that of John Farrow in BBC Four's comedy series Brian Pern.

Early life
Kitchen was born in Leicester. As a boy he was head chorister in the Church of the Martyrs choir, where he was a regular soloist. He attended the City of Leicester Boys' Grammar School, where he appeared on stage in a production of Cymbeline.

Career

Television and film
Kitchen was discovered at the Royal Academy of Dramatic Art (RADA) by talent agent Peter Froggatt. In the early 1970s, he appeared in small roles in films such as Unman, Wittering and Zigo (1971) and the Hammer film Dracula A.D. 1972 (1972) before becoming a fixture of British stage and television.

His early TV appearances include roles in Man at the Top (episode 4 "The Prime of Life", 1970) Play for Today (Hell's Angels by David Agnew, 1971), Thriller (1976), The Brontes of Haworth (1973, in which he played Branwell Brontë), Tales of the Unexpected and Beasts. He played the role of Martin in the original 1976 production of Dennis Potter's Brimstone and Treacle, Peter in Stephen Poliakoff's Caught on a Train, Edmund in the BBC Television Shakespeare production of King Lear, the Antipholi in the same series' production of The Comedy of Errors, Private Bamforth in the 1979 BBC television play of The Long and the Short and the Tall. Also in 1979 Kitchen appeared in an episode ("Runner") of the hard-hitting police drama The Professionals. He played the role of Duffy, a renegade former member of an organised crime network.

His other roles at this time include Larner in the film Breaking Glass (1980), Rochus Misch in The Bunker (1981), Berkeley Cole in the film Out of Africa (1985), the King of the United Kingdom in To Play the King (1993), an English land agent during the Irish Famine in The Hanging Gale (1995), and a recurring role as Bill Tanner in the Bond films GoldenEye (1995) and The World Is Not Enough (1999).

His later films include The Russia House (1990), Fools of Fortune (1990), Enchanted April (1992), The Trial (1993), Fatherland (1994), Doomsday Gun (1994),  The Hanging Gale (1995), Kidnapped (1995), Mrs Dalloway (1997), The Railway Children (2000), Proof of Life (2000), Lorna Doone (2001) and My Week with Marilyn (2011).

Between 2002 and 2015, he starred in the ITV mystery-drama Foyle's War as the lead character DCS Christopher Foyle; he was also a producer for the show, which comprised eight series. His other noted appearances include The Buccaneers as Sir Helmsley Thwaite (1995), Dandelion Dead (1994), A Royal Scandal (1996), The Last Contract (Sista Kontraktet, 1998) a Swedish film about the assassination of Prime Minister Olof Palme, Paul Abbott's Alibi in 2003, Andrew Davies' dramatization of Falling in 2005, ITV's three-part drama series Mobile (2007) and Channel 4's phone hacking comedy Hacks (2012).

Kitchen has guest-starred in roles in other popular British television shows such as Minder, Chancer, Inspector Morse, A Touch of Frost, Between the Lines, Pie in the Sky and Dalziel and Pascoe. He played Richard Crane in Reckless and John Farrow in the mockumentary The Life of Rock with Brian Pern.

Theatre
Kitchen is also a noted theatre actor. His roles have ranged from Ptolemy in Caesar and Cleopatra at the Belgrade Theatre in 1966, to Will in Howard Brenton's Magnificence at the Royal Court in 1973, to William Hogarth in Nick Dear's The Art of Success in 1986–87.

He played Mercutio in Romeo and Juliet for the RSC at Stratford and was a member of the National Theatre Company and the Young Vic, where he played Iago in Othello. In 1974 he appeared at Laurence Olivier's National Theatre in the play Spring Awakening opposite Peter Firth, Jenny Agutter, Beryl Reid and Cyril Cusack. Later he appeared opposite Sir Ralph Richardson and Sir John Gielgud in Harold Pinter's No Man's Land, directed by Peter Hall. In 1981 he played Melchior, the manservant of Zangler, in Tom Stoppard's play On the Razzle. In 1984 he played the cabin steward Dvornicheck in Tom Stoppard's play Rough Crossing.

Personal life
He has been married to Rowena Miller since 1988. They have two children.

Filmography

Film

Television

References

External links

Michael Kitchen BFI
Michael Kitchen Messageboard

1948 births
Living people
Alumni of RADA
English male film actors
English male stage actors
English male television actors
People educated at City of Leicester Boys' Grammar School
People from Leicester
Male actors from Leicestershire
20th-century English male actors
21st-century English male actors
National Youth Theatre members
English male Shakespearean actors